Quintain is a British-based property investment and development business, which operates through Urban Regeneration, focussed on schemes in Wembley Park and Asset Management, with headquarters in London.

History
The business was founded by Adrian Wyatt and Christopher Walls in 1992, and first listed on the London Stock Exchange in 1996. It acquired Fiscal Properties plc and Croydon Land & Estates Limited in 1997, English & Overseas Properties plc and Chesterfield Properties Limited in 1999, and Wembley (London) Limited, owners of the land around the stadium in Wembley, north London, in 2002.

At one stage, property investor Paul Kemsley invested heavily in the company. He then sold his shares to HBOS, which tried unsuccessfully to take over the company.

In February 2012 the company acquired Grafton Advisers, a property management business focused on West End commercial assets, which took the level of assets under management to £2.3bn.

Adrian Wyatt handed over to Maxwell James as CEO in May 2012.

At Wembley Park 500 homes were built and occupied, and Wembley Arena was renovated and re-opened. A 661-bedroom student scheme and 381-bedroom Hilton Hotel were built. The London Designer Outlet (LDO) opened in autumn 2013.

In July 2015, Quintain accepted a £700 million offer from Lone Star Funds. However, the deal had only been approved by 71.7% of the shareholders - short of the 75% required for the deal to go through. Activist hedge fund, Elliot Associates LP, took control of 12.9% of voting rights for Quintain. As a result of the pressure put on by the activist hedge fund, Lone Star Funds increased the buyout offer to £745 million. This represents a bid that is 10 pence higher than the previous. One of the intriguing parts of the buyout lies in Quintain's preapproval to build 5,000 houses surrounding Wembley Stadium - home to England's soccer team.

Quintain has approval to build 8,500 new homes near England's national football stadium at Wembley and Lone Star plans to accelerate the construction at the project after its bid is accepted.

In 2016, Quintain launched Tipi to manage all 6,000 of the Build to Rent apartments for rent at Wembley Park. In 2020 Tipi was re-branded to Quintain Living.

References

External links
 Official website
 Quintain Living
 Wembley Park

Real estate companies established in 1992
Property companies based in London
Wembley